Pace Kenya ,(Ian Gituku) is a melodious rapper, singer, audio engineer from Kenya. He started music at a very early age of 14 years playing the piano in his primary school, Gilgil Hills and proceeded to better his musical career onto his secondary school years. Pace worked as a solo artist at Studio 15 and then joined J.M.E Records in 2010 to release his first song Go Bananas. The song won the hearts of his friends and schoolmates who encouraged him to do music full-time. Ian is son to Ngene Gituku. 

Pace then started studying music production from Duboiz who was an audio engineer at Full anchor music. He worked with Duboiz to release the song Party Pale which gained him some recognition. Pace hired a manager in the year 2013 called Lewisko who helped him get his music public. In the same year, Pace got highly publicized on newspapers, magazines, online blogs and tv interviews.

Pace released his hit single Twende Safari which won charts for best instrumental and lyrical content and massive airplay on Kenyan media outlets. The single was produced by legendary producer Kevin Provoke. He then released Songa in December 2014 which was produced at Red Republic Studios by Majic Mike. He teamed up with Tedd Josiah to release Napata in 2015 which is receiving massive airplay as his career continues to grow.

Pace is currently studying Audio engineering and owns Pace Music Entertainment which is a Music Studio based in Nairobi. Pace has worked with Ogopa Deejays, Jimwat, Babz on the track and many others and plans on working on many more hits in the years to come.

References 
The Star Newspaper : Pace and Jimwat Collabo on Songa remix, 3 March 2015: 
Bottom Line reviews on Twende Safari by Pace, 4 April 2014: 
This Twende Safari Video Is A Must Watch !, 25 March 2014: 
Ghafla Kenya : Is This the New Nameless & Fundi Frank Combined?, 6 March 2013: 

1987 births
Living people
Kenyan musicians
Kenyan record producers